Entinostat, also known as SNDX-275 and MS-275, is a benzamide histone deacetylase inhibitor undergoing clinical trials for treatment of various cancers.

Entinostat inhibits class I HDAC1 and HDAC3 with IC50 of 0.51 μM and 1.7 μM, respectively.

Syndax pharmaceuticals currently holds the rights to Entinostat and recently received $26.6 million in funds to advance treatments of resistant cancers using epigenetic tools.

References

Benzamides
Carbamates
Histone deacetylase inhibitors
3-Pyridyl compounds
Orphan drugs